Bolshoy Log is a botanical reserve of regional importance in Krasnensky District of the Belgorod Oblast.

Vegetation
Most of the reserve is covered with steppe vegetation. On the right, the eastern slope of the ravine contains numerous outcrops of chalk, which are covered by the "lowered alpine" vegetation  (alpine postglacial relicts). Two species from the Red Book of Russia — Androsace koso-poljanskii  and Hedysarum grandiflorum — were discovered there. In the upper part of the ravine there are two small gully forests.

Environmental significance
In 2012 Bolshoy Log was included in the Emerald Network of prospective areas of the Europe in Belgorod Oblast.

References

Protected areas of Russia
Geography of Belgorod Oblast